Pseudocheirodon is a genus of characins found in southern Central America.  There are currently two described species in this genus.

Species
 Pseudocheirodon arnoldi (Boulenger, 1909)
 Pseudocheirodon terrabae W. A. Bussing, 1967

References
 

Characidae
Fish of Central America